Special Mission may refer to:
 Special Mission (1959 film), an East German black-and-white film
 Special Mission (1946 film), a French thriller film